Al-Mourada Sports Club is a Sudanese football club based in Al-Mourada, a suburb of Omdurman. Along with Al-Hilal and Al-Merrikh, they formed the triplet of Sudanese football, but they couldn't continue that legacy. They were one of the strongest teams in Sudan during their strong reign in the top division of the Sudanese football before being relegated to the 2nd division league due to some financial difficulties. Al-Mourada along with Hilal Alsahil are the only two teams who had broken the domination of the Sudanese football by Al-Hilal Omdurman and Elmerrikh SC as the league title was always won by either one of the rivals. Al-Mourada have been crowned as the champions of the Sudanese 1st division which was the top tier of the Sudanese football at that time in the year 1968. Their home stadium is Al-Mourada Stadium located in the Mourada district in Omdurman which is being renovated to coup with the international standards .

Name and meaning
Al-Mourada is derived from the Arabic word 'mowrid' (مورد) which is a port. The name was chosen to symbolise the importance of Al-Mourada suburb as a local port for goods. The football team is symbolized with the red and blue color.

Honours

National titles
Sudan Premier League
Champion (2) 1967,1988

Sudan Cup
Champion (2) 1995,1997

Performance in CAF competitions
African Cup of Champions Clubs: 2 appearances
1968: Quarter-Finals
1989: Quarter-Finals

African Cup Winners' Cup: 4 appearances
1988 – First Round
1996 – Second Round
1998 – First Round
2002 – Quarter-finals

CAF Cup: 2 appearances
1992 – First Round
1994 – Semi-finals

Performance in UAFA Competitions
Arab Club Champions Cup : 1 appearances
1989 – Preliminary stage

Arab Cup Winners' Cup: 3appearances
1993 –Semi-finals
1996 – Group stage
1998 – Group stage

Performance in CECAFA Competitions
CECAFA Clubs Cup: 3 appearances
1991 – Group stage
1995 – Third Place
1997 – Quarter-finals

Current squad (2018-19)
Below the current squad of the team.

References

External links

Team profile – Goalzz.com

Mourada
Mourada
Omdurman
1927 establishments in Sudan